The Tanzania national basketball team represents Tanzania in international competitions. It is administrated by the Tanzania Basketball Federation (TBF).

Competitive record

Summer Olympics
yet to qualify

FIBA Basketball World Cup
yet to qualify

FIBA Africa Championship

African Games

yet to qualify

Commonwealth Games

never participated

Current roster

At the 2013 Afrobasket Qualification: (last publicized squad) 

|}

| valign="top" |

Head coach

Assistant coaches

Legend

Club – describes lastclub before the tournament
Age – describes ageon 1 July 2012
|}

See also
 Tanzania national under-19 basketball team
 Tanzania women's national basketball team

Kit

Manufacturer
Jordan

External links
Tanzania Basketball Records at FIBA Archive
Tanzania Basketball at Afrobasket.com

References

Men's national basketball teams
Basketball
Basketball in Tanzania
Basketball teams in Tanzania
1968 establishments in Tanzania